Friemersheim is a settlement in Garden Route District Municipality in the Western Cape province of South Africa.

A small agricultural community about 15 km from Groot-Brakrivier, Friemersheim was founded by a German missionary in the early nineteenth century. In 1869, through the efforts of Reverend Johann Kretzen of the Berliner Missionary Society, a school and church were built on the farm Gonnakraal, which Kretzen had bought for his sister.

After his sister's death in 1872, he bequeathed the farm to the Dutch Reformed Missionary Society, and later it was renamed Friemersheim, after Kretzen's town of birth in Germany. It remained in the ownership of the Dutch Reformed Church until the 1960s, when it was sold to the state.

References

Populated places in the Mossel Bay Local Municipality